Leonor Gonzalez Mina (born June 16, 1934 in Jamundí, Valle del Cauca) is a prominent Afro-Colombian musician and actress, known as "la Negra Grande de Colombia" ("The Great Black Woman of Colombia").  She is known for her work in several genres of Colombian music, including bolero, pasillo, bambuco, and especially cumbia. She is known for songs such as "Mi Buenaventura", "Navidad Negra", and "Yo Me Llamo Cumbia".

Biography 
The musical career of Leonor Gonzalez Mina began when she was 18 years old, when she decided to leave her home.  After six months, she participated as a dancer in a ballet by Delia Zapata Olivella and her brother Manuel, acting before an audience in Paris.  With this dance company she travelled internationally to countries including China, Germany, and the Soviet Union.  When she returned to Colombia, she produced her first record, titled "Cantos de mi tierra y de mi raza".

Leonor Gonzalez Mina is a reference of cultural identity, Valluna and Colombian, that for more than 60 years of a successful artistic career has taken the Afro-Pacific culture to many areas of the planet. She has shown all the rhythms of Colombian culture,  from a cumbia to a bambuco, her life and work has been a legacy of musical identity and nation. She has recorded more than 30 records during her lifetime.

In 1975 Leonor Gonzalez mina represented her country in the fourth edition of the OTI Festival, which was held in San Juan, Puerto Rico. Her competing song, entitled "Campesino de ciudad" (City farmer) talks about the difficulties that the people from the rural areas face in the big cities in search for a better life. The song, which summarized a sad reality in Latin America, moved both the audience and the juries and she got the third place in a tie with the venezuelan entrant, Mirla Castellanos.

Leonor Gonzalez Mina also acted in a Colombian television series, and participated in the congressional elections of 1998, when she was elected as a cameral representative for Bogotá with the Colombian Liberal Party.

Gonzalez Mina is considered  among the most popular Colombian singers.

Songs 
Some of her songs are:

 Toto La Momposina - La Mar de Musicas (Cartagena)
 Liliana Montes-"Aguacerito llové" del álbum Corazón Pacífico
 Mi Buenaventura/Mi Peregoyo - Leonor González Mina by Mulato de Jesus Maria
Navidad Negra- (Pescador de mi tierra) Leonor González Mina
 Simplemente la Negra Grande de Colombia -Soy de Buenaventura

References

External links
  News report on Leonor Gonzalez Mina's 72nd birthday
Festival Petronio Alvarez, 2010

1934 births
Living people
20th-century Colombian women singers
Afro-Colombian women